The Theatre Musicians Association (TMA) is a Players' Conference of the American Federation of Musicians (AFM). TMA represents American Musical Theatre musicians who perform in musical theatre orchestras in the United States, Canada, and Puerto Rico. A voluntary organization supported entirely by member dues, TMA is dedicated to raising the theatre-going experience for all – actors, musicians and especially audiences.

References

American Federation of Musicians